The 1806–07 United States Senate elections were held on various dates in various states. As these U.S. Senate elections were prior to the ratification of the Seventeenth Amendment in 1913, senators were chosen by state legislatures. Senators were elected over a wide range of time throughout 1806 and 1807, and a seat may have been filled months late or remained vacant due to legislative deadlock. In these elections, terms were up for the senators in Class 3.

The Democratic-Republican Party increased its overwhelming control of the Senate by one additional seat.  The Federalists went into the elections with such a small share of Senate seats (7 out of 34, or 21%) that even if they had won every election, they would still have remained a minority caucus.  As it was, however, they lost one of the two seats they were defending and picked up no gains from their opponents.

Results summary 
Senate party division, 10th Congress (1807–1809)

 Majority party: Democratic-Republican (28)
 Minority party: Federalist (6)
 Other parties: 0
 Total seats: 34

Change in composition

Before the elections

Beginning of the next Congress

Race summaries 
Except if/when noted, the number following candidates is the whole number vote(s), not a percentage.

Special elections during the preceding Congress 
In these special elections, the winner was seated during 1806 or before March 4, 1807; ordered by election date.

Races leading to the next Congress 
In these regular elections, the winner was seated on March 4, 1807; ordered by state.

All the elections involved the Class 3 seats.

Special elections during the next Congress 
In this special election, the winner was seated in 1807 after March 4; ordered by election date.

Connecticut

Connecticut (regular)

Connecticut (special)

Georgia

Georgia (special, class 2) 

Democratic-Republican Abraham Baldwin died March 4, 1807. Democratic-Republican George Jones was appointed August 27. 1807 to continue the term, pending a special election.  Jones ran in the November 7, 1807 special election, but lost to Democratic-Republican William H. Crawford.

Class 3 

Democratic-Republican James Jackson, who had served since 1793 died March 19, 1806.

Georgia (special, class 3) 

Democratic-Republican John Milledge was elected June 19, 1806.

Georgia (regular) 

Milledge was later re-elected to the next term.

Kentucky

Kentucky (regular)

Kentucky (special)

Maryland 

The Maryland General Assembly convened to both fill the unexpired term of Robert Wright who resigned to become Governor of Maryland, and to fill the next term. This election was therefore both the regular and special.

Philip Reed won election over William Hayward by a margin of 17.50%, or 33 votes, for the Class 3 seat.

New Hampshire

New Hampshire (regular)

New Hampshire (special)

New York

North Carolina

Ohio

Pennsylvania

Rhode Island (special)

South Carolina

Vermont

Vermont (regular)

Vermont (special)

See also
 1806 United States elections
 1806–07 United States House of Representatives elections
 9th United States Congress
 10th United States Congress

Notes

References

External links